Matthias Jürgen Zimmermann (born 16 June 1992) is a German professional footballer who plays as a defender for Fortuna Düsseldorf.

Career
Zimmermann started his footballing career in VfB Grötzingen's youth categories. In 2008, he moved to Karlsruher SC. He made his debut for Karlsruhe on 6 December 2009, in a 3–1 away victory against Rot Weiss Ahlen, after coming off the bench to replace Lars Stindl in the 90th minute.

On 18 June 2011, Zimmermann joined Borussia Mönchengladbach, signing a three-year contract with the new club, lasting until 2014. In January 2013, Zimmermann was loaned to SpVgg Greuther Fürth.

SV Sandhausen
On 27 June 2013, he signed a season long loan deal with SV Sandhausen.

VfB Stuttgart
For the 2015–16 season Zimmermann moved to VfB Stuttgart II. On 2 May 2016, he made his debut for the first team of VfB Stuttgart against Werder Bremen. Zimmermann extended his contract with the Bundesliga team of Stuttgart on 20 December 2017 until June 2019.

Fortuna Düsseldorf
On 16 July 2018, it was announced that Zimmermann would join Fortuna Düsseldorf on a two-year contract.

References

External links
 

1992 births
Living people
German footballers
Footballers from Baden-Württemberg
Germany youth international footballers
Association football defenders
Karlsruher SC II players
Karlsruher SC players
Borussia Mönchengladbach players
Borussia Mönchengladbach II players
SpVgg Greuther Fürth players
SV Sandhausen players
VfB Stuttgart II players
VfB Stuttgart players
Fortuna Düsseldorf players
Bundesliga players
2. Bundesliga players
3. Liga players